Sotirios Garaganis (born 13 February 1999) is a Greek sprinter competing mostly in the 100 metres. He represented Greece at the 2018 IAAF World U20 Championships, as a member of the  relay team.

Para-athletics

Garaganis represented Greece at the 2020 Summer Paralympics, as a guide for Athanasios Ghavelas, in the 100 metres T11 event. They won the gold medal with a world record time of 10.82.

References

1999 births
Living people
Greek male sprinters
Medalists at the 2020 Summer Paralympics
Paralympic gold medalists for Greece
Athletes from Athens
21st-century Greek people